Tommaso is an Italian given name.

Tommaso may also refer to:

 4653 Tommaso, a main-belt asteroid
 Tommaso (2016 film), a 2016 Italian comedy-drama film
 Tommaso (2019 film), a 2019 Italian film
 Tommaso bikes, bicycle manufacturing company

See also 

 Di Tommaso
 Tomasso